Samuele Massolo (born 4 May 1996) is an Italian footballer who plays as a goalkeeper for Palermo in the Italian Serie B.

Career
Massolo started his career with Sampdoria, being part of their youth system and also being handed a first-team number during the 2014–15 season.

He was successively loaned out to Serie D amateurs Sanremese, with whom he made his senior debut as a player, marking a total 32 appearances and 12 clean sheets during his stay at the club. His quality appearances won him interest from Serie B club Virtus Entella, who signed him permanently.

In January 2020, Massolo was signed by Serie C side Sambenedettese on a permanent deal. After being released by Sambenedettese, he joined Serie C club Fermana in October 2020;

In July 2021, Massolo signed for Serie C fallen giants Palermo, his signing being explicitly requested by head coach Giacomo Filippi, who had worked with him during his days as Roberto Boscaglia's assistant at Virtus Entella. Originally signed as an understudy to first choice goalkeeper Alberto Pelagotti, he started being occasionally featured in the starting lineup under new head coach Silvio Baldini, who then promoted him as first choice goalkeeper for the promotion playoffs, which Palermo eventually won.

On 7 September 2022, he signed a contract extension until 30 June 2024.

Career statistics

Club

References

External links
 

1996 births
People from La Spezia
Footballers from Liguria
Living people
Italian footballers
Association football goalkeepers
Virtus Entella players
Palermo F.C. players
Serie B players
Serie C players
Serie D players
Sportspeople from the Province of La Spezia